The 1966 Colorado gubernatorial election was held on November 8, 1966. Incumbent Republican John Arthur Love defeated Democratic nominee Robert Lee Knous with 54.05% of the vote.

Primary elections
Primary elections were held on September 13, 1966.

Democratic primary

Candidates
Robert Lee Knous, incumbent Lieutenant Governor

Results

Republican primary

Candidates
John Arthur Love, incumbent Governor

Results

General election

Candidates
Major party candidates
John Arthur Love, Republican 
Robert Lee Knous, Democratic

Other candidates
Levi Martinez, Independent

Results

References

1966
Colorado
Gubernatorial
November 1966 events in the United States